Intelligent automation, or alternately intelligent process automation, is a software term that refers to a combination of artificial intelligence (AI) and robotic process automation (RPA). Companies use intelligent automation to cut costs by using artificial-intelligence-powered robotic software to replace workers who handle repetitive tasks. The term is similar to hyperautomation, a concept identified by research group Gartner as being one of the top technology trends of 2020.

Technology
Intelligent automation applies the assembly line concept of breaking tasks into repetitive steps to digital business processes.  Rather than having humans do each step, intelligent automation replaces each step with an intelligent software robot or bot, improving efficiency.

Applications
The technology is used to process unstructured content.  Common applications include self-driving cars, self-checkouts at grocery stores, smart home assistants, and appliances. Businesses can apply data and machine learning to build predictive analytics that react to consumer behavior changes, or to implement RPA to improve manufacturing floor operations.

The technology has also been used to automate the workflow behind distributing Covid-19 vaccines.  Data provided by hospital systems’ electronic health records can be processed to identify and educate patients, and schedule vaccinations.

Intelligent Automation can provide real-time insights on profitability and efficiency. However in an April 2022 survey by Alchemmy, despite three quarters of businesses acknowledging the importance of Artificial Intelligence to their future development, just a quarter of business leaders (25%) considered Intelligent Automation a “game changer” in understanding current performance. 42% of CTOs see “shortage of talent” as the main obstacle to implementing Intelligent Automation in their business, while 36% of CEOs see ‘upskilling and professional development of existing workforce’ as the most significant adoption barrier.

See also
Robotic process automation
Artificial intelligence
Automation

References

&
Business software
Automation software
Information economy
Machine learning